The Big Beat is the third studio album by singer Johnnie Ray, released on Columbia Records in 1957. Its catalogue number is CL 961.

Track listing

Personnel 
Johnnie Ray – vocals
 Ray Conniff – arrangements (1 to 6)
 Ray Ellis – arrangements (7 to 12)
 Hal Reiff – photography

References 

1957 albums
Johnnie Ray albums
Columbia Records albums